William Charles Leonard Creese (27 December 1907 – 9 March 1974) was a South African born English first-class cricketer. Creese was a left-handed batsman who bowled left-arm medium pace.

Career for Hampshire
Len Creese left South Africa as a young man, determined to make a career in England as a professional cricketer. He made his first-class debut for Hampshire in the 1928 County Championship against Somerset. Creese represented Hampshire in 278 first-class matches from 1928 to 1939, with his first-class career with Hampshire ending due to the start of the Second World War. Creese's final appearance for the county came in the 1939 County Championship against Yorkshire at Dean Park Cricket Ground in Bournemouth.

Creese was regarded as one of the best all-rounders on the county circuit. In his 278 matches for the county, Creese scored 9,894 runs at a batting average of 24.01, with 50 half centuries, 6 centuries with a high score of 241 against Northamptonshire in 1939. Such was Creese's skill with the bat that he passed the 1,000 run mark for a season five times, with his best season being in 1933 when he scored 	1,275 runs at an average of 35.41, with 5 half centuries, 2 centuries and a high score of 165*.

Creese was also a consistent bowler, taking 401 wickets for the county at a bowling average of 27.78, with 15 five-wicket hauls and 1 ten wicket haul in a match, with best bowling figures of 8/37 against Lancashire in 1936. The 1936 season was Creese's best with the ball, during which he took 95 wickets at an average of 22.93, with 5 five wicket hauls and best figures of 8/37. It was during the 1936 season that Creese narrowly missed out on the all-rounders double, scoring 1,331 runs and coupled with 95 wickets, bringing him just short of the 1,000 runs and 100 wickets mark. In addition to his batting and bowling, Creese was also an able fielder, taking 190 catches for Hampshire.

John Arlott described Creese as "sturdily built, strong, brave and a combative – but inconsistent – cricketer", adding that while Creese was unsure against spin bowling he was outstanding against pace bowling: "it often seemed that the faster the bowling, the better he liked it". A note of Hampshire trivia came when Creese accidentally shot his teammate Gerry Hill while Hill was bowling in the nets. The bullet stayed in Hill's leg for the remainder of his life. Commenting on the incident Hill said: "Creese was as mad as a hatter. He had this gun and whether it went off accidentally, I don't know... I was running in to bowl and it knocked me off my feet."

Later career
In addition to playing first-class matches for Hampshire, Creese also represented the Players in the 1935 Gentlemen v Players fixture and represented the Combined Services in two matches after the war, coming against Oxford University and Surrey in 1946.

In 1949 Creese joined Dorset, playing for the county in the Minor Counties Championship from 1949 to 1950, with all four of his fixtures for Dorset coming against Berkshire.

Prior to joining Dorset Creese stood as an Umpire in three Minor Counties fixtures; two in 1947 and one in 1948. After this Creese served as a Groundsman at the Central Recreation Ground at Hastings for some years, during which his small grandson, whom he idolised, was killed by the heavy roller in the interval between innings in a Festival match. He later became head groundsman at the Sussex County Ground at Hove. In the late 1950s Creese was the landlord of the Dripping Well public house in Hastings.

Creese died at Buckland, Kent on 9 March 1974.

References

External links
Len Creese at Cricinfo
Len Creese at CricketArchive
Matches and detailed statistics for Len Creese

1907 births
1974 deaths
English people of South African descent
English cricketers
Hampshire cricketers
Players cricketers
Combined Services cricketers
English cricket umpires
Dorset cricketers
English cricketers of 1919 to 1945
South African emigrants to the United Kingdom